The Star of Bengal was an iron three-masted  merchant sailing vessel built in Belfast in 1874 by Harland and Wolff Industries (the shipyard that later constructed the Titanic). Though built towards the end of the Age of Sail, she was successfully operated for 24 years by the British trading company J.P. Corry & Co. The ship mainly travelled on the London-Calcutta trading route, but made a few voyages to Australian and American ports.

Following a formative change in the shipping industry, J.P. Corry switched to steam vessels and sold its sailing fleet around 1898. At the same time, merchant shipping along the United States Pacific Coast was experiencing a boom triggered by Klondike and Nome gold rushes intensifying the colonization of the Pacific Northwest and increasing the demand for both passenger and cargo shipping in the area. As a result, the Star of Bengal was purchased by San Francisco trading company J.J. Smith & Co. and, along with many other old European vessels, taken around Cape Horn to the Pacific Ocean. J.J. Smith conducted an overhaul of the ship and re-rigged her from a full-rigged ship to a barque to decrease operating costs.

J.J. Smith operated the Star of Bengal for 7 more years, mainly hauling grain and coal. As steamships pushed sailing vessels out of business, the trading company could no longer operate her for profit, and in 1905, the Star of Bengal was sold to the Alaska Packers' Association. This company used its sailing ships for a single voyage a year: a spring sail carrying seasonal workers and supplies from San Francisco to one of its Alaskan canneries, followed by a return trip in early fall with the workers and a load of canned salmon.

On September 20, 1908, at the beginning of her return trip from Fort Wrangell to San Francisco, the Star of Bengal was in tow in open sea when she encountered a storm. The ship struck the rocks near the shore of Coronation Island and sunk, killing approximately 110 of 138 people aboard. Captain Nicholas Wagner survived the wreck and publicly blamed the tugboat captains for the event. After months of federal investigation, no one was held responsible. As of 2015, the wreck of the Star of Bengal remains among the top five worst maritime disasters in Alaskan history.

Later, Captain Wagner's daughter, Joan Lowell, pursued literary career, that led to the Star of Bengals portrayal in fiction. Her book The Cradle of the Deep, was the third-bestselling book of 1929 and contained an embellished account of the wreck. A melodramatic play, Star of Bengal, written by Thompson Buchanan and produced by Christopher Morley, is also set on the ship.

Specifications 
The Star of Bengal was built by shipbuilder Harland and Wolff Industries in Belfast, Ireland, in 1873 and 1874. Those were the years when the construction of three-masted iron ships reached its zenith, and the shipbuilding industry produced a series of the fastest ships in this category, the Star of Bengal being one of them.

Initially constructed as a two-deck three-masted full-rigged ship, in 1898 the Star of Bengal was re-rigged as a barque. Her gross tonnage was 1877, net tonnage 1694, and tonnage under deck, 1684.

The Star of Bengal had a  bar keel. She was originally constructed with three cement bulkheads, but after her overhaul in 1898, only one bulkhead remained in service. Overall, the ship's hull required  of stiffening.

History of operations

J.P. Corry & Co. 

The Star of Bengal was ordered by shipping company J.P. Corry & Co., which was founded in Belfast and  headquartered in London. At the time of her launch on January 3, 1874, the Star of Bengal was the largest vessel in gross tonnage in service of J.P. Corry & Co. (in December 1874, she was surpassed by the  Star of Russia). These two Stars remained the company's largest sailing vessels. The Star of Bengal's maiden voyage officially began on April 25, 1874, when she sailed out of London towards Melbourne. She continued to San Francisco and returned to Liverpool.

The company's sailing vessels operated three main trading routes, linking London with Canada, India, and Australia. The Star of Bengal largely remained on the London-Calcutta route, with occasional visits to Melbourne, Bombay, and Valparaíso. The ship's average time for the London-Calcutta-London round-trip was 7 months and 24 days. The shortest trip was 7 months and 2 days, and the longest 8 months and 14 days.

John Smyth was the Star of Bengal's first captain. He remained at this position for eleven years, until he took command of another company ship, the Star of Erin in 1885. He eventually graduated to commanding large company steamers, earning the unofficial title of "the commodore of the Star fleet."

William Legg became the next Star of Bengal's captain in 1885. During the ship's 1886 voyage to Calcutta, the Scottish maritime novelist George Cupples sailed as the Star of Bengal's honorary first mate. The ship arrived in Calcutta on August 19, 1886; shortly after her arrival, the captain broke his leg. Under the circumstances, the 63-year-old novelist successfully assumed command. The Star of Bengal was about to leave India and sail out of Garden Reach, when on September 25, the steamship Gulf of Mexico collided with the moored Star of Bengal, resulting in a month of repairs. Cupples finally sailed out on October 26, bringing the Star of Bengal back to London on February 1, 1887.

Upon arrival, Cupples yielded the captain's position to DeGruchy, who remained the ship's captain for one voyage. In 1888, William Legg returned to the Star of Bengal's command. In 1892, after four more years of service, he was replaced by John M. Hart, formerly John Smyth's first mate. Hart remained in command of the ship until 1898, when J.P. Corry & Co.'s decision to put its money into steamers led to the sale of its last remaining sailing vessels, including the Star of Bengal.

J.J. Smith & Co. 

San Francisco-based trading company J.J. Smith & Co. acquired the Star of Bengal in June 1898. At that time, maritime shipping out of United States Pacific ports was undergoing a major change. After the impact of the Long Depression on regional shipping peaked in 1896–1897, the demand for Pacific Coast maritime transportation unexpectedly soared. It was driven by the Nome Gold Rush, which intensified the colonization of the Pacific Northwest and Alaska and created numerous opportunities for new passenger and trade routes. As a result, many old vessels were purchased to service these routes.

J.J. Smith & Co. re-registered the Star of Bengal in the United States, and in 1898, the 25-year-old ship underwent a major overhaul. To make the ship's operations more cost-effective, her mizzen-mast was re-rigged from square to fore-and-aft, and the Star of Bengal turned from a full-rigged ship to a barque. She got new decks, but the number of bulkheads in service decreased from three to one. In 1904, a donkey boiler was installed on the ship to assist the crew with raising sails.

While the Star of Bengal sailed under J.J. Smith & Co., her captain was H. Henderson. The company operated the ship on a variety of trading missions, mainly trading grain and coal. In an incident in March 1899, the ship almost caught fire when, from Newcastle to San Francisco, her load of coal overheated and became spontaneously combustible. In 1905, the J.J. Smith & Co. could no longer operate the Star of Bengal with profit and sold her to the Alaska Packers' Association.

Alaska Packers' Association 

The Alaska Packers' Association (APA) was another beneficiary of Alaskan exploration, and an active consumer of old vessels. Based in San Francisco, the company was engaged in Alaska salmon fishery; it operated salmon canneries across Alaska through a fleet of ships engaged in transporting packed salmon and fishery workers. The company purchased several iron sailing ships originally built for J.P. Corry & Co., including the Star of Bengal, and renamed all of its remaining ships by adding prefix "Star of-" to their names in an attempt to achieve instant name recognition. The APA became the largest company engaged in Alaskan salmon fisheries and, by 1908, the largest salmon-packing concern in the world.

Beginning in 1905, the Star of Bengal's captain was Nicholas Wagner. The company had the Star of Bengal insured by Lloyd's. In 1908, the ship was appraised between $70,000 and $75,000 ($1,900,000 and $2,000,000 in 2020 dollars). Taking advantage of "good strong old British iron" and "lower insurance rates," APA operated the ship seasonally: in the spring, she would sail from San Francisco to Alaska, bringing seasonal workers, fuel, and other supplies to the canneries; in the fall, she would sail back loaded with canned salmon and returning workers. In the winter, the Star of Bengal was moored at Alameda, California with other ships of the "Star fleet."

At the time, salmon canneries required cheap, unskilled labor, and the Alaska Packers' Association primarily hired immigrants of Chinese, Japanese, and Filipino descent as seasonal workers. These workers were provided in bulk by Chinese labor contractors operating out of San Francisco. On the company ships, "Orientals" were segregated from white workers and crew, in part due to separate habits and diet and because they were treated as second-class citizens. The APA supplied these workers with housing, fuel, and water, while Chinese labor contractors provided them with food, whiskey, and opium.

Additional wooden structures were added to the Star of Bengal's hold to accommodate seasonal workers. In 1906, the wholesale price of one case of salmon was $5.80, so the ship's full load of salmon represented $500,000 in 1906 dollars ($13,000,000 in 2020 dollars).

Wreck

Background 

In 1908, the Star of Bengal sailed from San Francisco on April 22, arriving at Fort Wrangell on May 5. She was loaded with supplies for Wrangell cannery, including fuel for the season, and had 146 people on board, 110 of which were Asian. Because maneuvering a sailing vessel through a maze of small islands and narrow straits is too risky, the last  of the voyage, from Warren Island to Fort Wrangell, the Star of Bengal was tugged by the  250-hp Chilkat, an Alaska Packers' Association steamboat. That summer, the Wrangell cannery yielded 52,000 cases of salmon which were loaded on the ship while she was moored next to the cannery for the season.

The events of September 20, 1908

Loss of control 
The return trip began on September 19 with 137 or 138 people on board. This time, the tug Chilkat was unavailable to take the Star of Bengal into the open sea, so on company orders, she was towed by two smaller steamboats – the  90-hp Hattie Gage and the  225-hp Kayak, neither of which were designed for vessel towing or large enough to perform the operation individually. The Kayak's draft was too shallow, so when towing a vessel she risked propeller and rudder being submerged too shallowly for effective operation, especially in rough weather. The Hattie Gage's aft was not equipped with proper bitts, so  and  hawser had to be tied directly to her mast. Both tugs were owned by the Alaska Packers' Association.

The Hattie Gage was under command of Captain Erwin Ferrar, who had 35 years of experience at sea, including 13 seasons in Alaska. The Kayak was captained by Captain Patrick Hamilton, who had recently obtained his captain's license after 10 years of experience at sea as mate and boatswain. Together with Captain Wagner of the Star of Bengal, they decided to proceed with the tow, as the weather was calm. Captain Ferrar was placed in charge of the operation. The vessels passed point Baker at 3:50 p.m., and reached the  strait between Coronation Island and Warren Island at 10:00 p.m. By that time, the wind has strengthened, and the visibility was poor due to rain, mist, and darkness. The lookouts on both tugs could no longer see the Star of Bengal, which was  behind them.

By midnight, the flotilla was on its final leg between Warren and Coronation islands, and the captains of both tugboats became concerned with the freshening southeast headwind. The vessels were making very little forward progress, and getting closer to Coronation Island than expected. With the poor visibility, the crews of all three ships relied on lead lines to ascertain their positions with respect to land. As the wind continued to strengthen, by 1:00 a.m. Captains Farrar and Hamilton, whose tugboats were moving  from each other, negotiated a turn to jibe the Star of Bengal, i.e., to pull her through the wind and change her tack from port to starboard.

The Star of Bengal's crew also became concerned, but could neither see nor communicate with the tugboats. At 1:45 a.m., the Hattie Gage blew a series of whistles signaling the maneuver, which were heard on the Star of Bengal. However, as the tugs started the turn, the Kayak's rudder proved ineffective in the rough weather, and she failed to turn into the wind. For some time, the tugs worked against each other, their combined effort overpowering the Star of Bengal's rudder and preventing her from making the turn to safety. Aware of the looming danger, Star of Bengal first mate begged Captain Wagner to sever the Kayak's hawser, which was dragging the ship in the wrong direction, but the captain refused, as maritime law prohibited such action on the part of the vessel in tow.

At one point, the tugs succeeded turning the Star of Bengal to a starboard tack, but she immediately reverted to port tack. Whether due to a sudden change in direction of the wind or to an error on part of the Star of Bengal's crew, her sails were filled aback. This resulted in a more dangerous situation, pushing all three vessels towards the rocky shore of Coronation island. The two tugs continued to struggle to pull the Star of Bengal out of danger, but the ships continued to drift leeward. Both tugs started to experience mechanical problems with their boilers due to overloading, and the Hattie Gage developed structural problems with her mast mounting.

Sinking 

With the dawn, the Star of Bengal's crew realized how dangerous the ship's position was: just  from the rocky beach of Coronation Island, barely held by her anchors amidst the storm. By 7:00 a.m., the wind turned into a gale, reaching . With no tugs in sight, the crew started preparing for the worst. All men aboard received life-preservers; however, most of the Chinese passengers did not put them on. Captain Wagner called for volunteers who would attempt to reach the shore in a lifeboat to secure a line on shore in order to evacuate passengers with a breeches buoy. The crew dumped oil into the sea to calm the waves, but the first attempt to lower a lifeboat failed, as it immediately smashed into pieces.

The second attempt to lower the boat was successful, and manned by four volunteers, the boat reached the shore and broke into pieces on the impact with the rocky beach. All four men survived the crash, and by 9:00 a.m. they managed to secure a rope from the Star of Bengal to a tree. The donkey boiler was used to keep the rope strained. However, as another volunteer was climbing along the rope with the breeches buoy, the ship's anchors finally gave in to the storm. The rope became unstable and unsuitable for evacuation, and the volunteer was catapulted  into the air and killed as he landed on the ship's deck. At 9:32 a.m., the ship struck the rocks.

Passengers and crew found themselves in  water surrounded by wooden cases of canned salmon and empty steel fuel drums from the ship's hold. Frenzied by the storm, the debris was almost impossible to swim through. Depending on the exact number of passengers aboard the Star of Bengal, 110 or 111 people died in the wreck, and 27 people survived. The beach was soon covered by dead bodies, many mutilated by the ship's cargo, and many drowned in the powerful undertow. The 27 survivors included the four volunteers and Captain Wagner, who was pulled unconscious from the water by crew members.

The survivors used the leftovers of fuel to make fire and stay warm. They made an extensive search for survivors, buried white corpses, and left Asian corpses behind, covered by ship's sails. The survivors were picked up by the Kayak the next day. The US government cable ship Burnside arrived at the scene of the wreck later, and her crew buried the remaining corpses in a mass grave. With the high number of casualties, as of 2015, the wreck is among the top five worst marine disasters in the history of Alaska.

Investigation 
As soon as the survivors reached shore, Captain Wagner publicly accused the tugboat captains of "criminal cowardice." He alleged that they abandoned the Star of Bengal in a dangerous situation and ignored her distress lights, thus missing the window of opportunity before the storm intensified at 8:00 a.m. when passengers could have been taken from the Star of Bengal aboard the tugboats. Captain Ferrar denied the existence of such a window, as had there been a period of calm sea, Captain Wagner could have evacuated his men ashore. The case came under federal investigation, and two inspectors started hearings in San Francisco on October 3, 1908.

The hearing was initially aimed at assessing the responsibility of the Star of Bengal's crew. Captain Wagner and his first mate, Victor Johansen, were interrogated by the inspectors; both repeated the accusation against the captains of the tugs. During the hearing, the Alaska Packers' Association provided written testimonies of nautical experts that supported the position of the tugs' captains. On October 7, Captain Wagner and the first mate filed formal charges of cowardice against the tug captains.

Captains Farrar and Hamilton provided their written testimonies, insisting that their actions were justified, as after the Star of Bengal dropped her anchors they were powerless to assist the large ship and responsible to ensure safety of their own vessels and crews. After completing repairs, the Hattie Gage steamed to Fort Wrangell to seek assistance of a larger ship, the Burnside, while the Kayak went searching for the Star of Bengal, eventually locating the survivors. The tugs' crews were summoned to San Francisco to testify on October 23; both crews supported their captains' testimonies. The hearing of witnesses ended on October 27, and the inspectors published their findings on January 27, 1909. They exonerated the tugboat captains, stating that there was not sufficient evidence of criminal cowardice. Moreover, on April 15, the inspectors revoked Captain Wagner's license, holding him responsible for the loss of life. Captain Wagner immediately appealed the decision and it was promptly reversed by the supervising inspector as "unsubstantiated."

Aftermath 
The wreck of the Star of Bengal was described as "one of the worst disasters" of the Pacific coast maritime history. Due to the high number of casualties, as of 2015, the wreck of the Star of Bengal remains in the top 5 worst marine disasters in the history of Alaska. Both, the ship and her cargo were declared a total loss. The cost of the cargo was estimated at $227,000 ($6,000,000), bringing the total value of hull and cargo to $330,000 ($8,800,000): the largest maritime loss in Alaska waters at the time. The ship and her cargo was insured by Lloyd's, which limited the losses of the Alaska Packers' Association. The APA made volunteer donations to the families of the lost of more than $16,000 ($425,000) in total, which was considered generous at the time.

After his license was restored, Captain Wagner continued to command other sailing vessels. Captains Farrar and Hamilton were tried by the court of public opinion, and as of 2001, their role in the wreck remains uncertain. In 2008, a centennial commemoration of the wreck was organized in the Wrangell Museum.

Wreckage 
In later years, numerous attempts have been made by divers to locate the wreckage of the Star of Bengal, but as of 2022, they were unsuccessful. On 6 May 2022, an eight-person team embarked on the research vessel Endeavor to find and authenticate the wreckage, as well as to retrieve artifacts. The expedition consisted of both divers and cultural experts, who sought to document the cultural and social significance of the shipwreck.

In fiction

The Cradle of the Deep 

In March 1929, Captain Wagner's daughter, Joan Lowell, published a book titled The Cradle of the Deep purported to be her autobiography. In the book, Lowell spends the first 17 years of her life aboard her father's schooner, the Minnie A. Caine, barefoot and surrounded by the all-male crew. Initially, The Cradle of the Deep received multiple positive reviews from different sources, including The Washington Post, Time, Life, and the Los Angeles Times.

The book soon became a bestseller, topping the non-fiction category of The New York Times Best Seller list. Even though it was quickly exposed as a hoax, the subsequent literary scandal and the media frenzy propelled The Cradle of the Deep into its fiction category, and The Cradle of the Deep finished 1929 as the third best-selling book of the year.

In chapter 11 of The Cradle of the Deep, Lowell gives her account of the Star of Bengal's wreck, which is loosely based on the stories she heard from her father. In the book, ominous signs foreshadow the wreck, and the full responsibility of the disaster is placed on the shoulders of the tugboat captains, who mishandle their drunken and inexperienced crews, become "panic-stricken," and flee the scene. Furthermore, the tug captains commit other acts "beyond human comprehension," including burning the corpses of the Chinese passengers "like rubbish" on Coronation Island, and salvaging the food from the Star of Bengal's hold that was mixed with the dead men and selling the cooked mixture to Eskimos.

Inspired by the scandal, humorist Corey Ford published a parody on Lowell's book titled Salt Water Taffy; or, Twenty thousand leagues away from the sea; the almost incredible autobiography of Capt. Ezra Triplett's seafaring daughter, by June Triplett, which also became a bestseller. In his book, Ford exaggerates the most grotesque details of The Cradle of the Deep, thus demonstrating the fraudulent nature of the "autobiography." Chapter 6 of Salt Water Taffy, which mimics chapter 11 of The Cradle of the Deep, Ford ridicules Lowell's devotion to the maritime omens that allegedly preceded the Star of Bengal's last voyage and the portrayal of her father as an infallible captain.

Broadway play  
In 1929, Joan Lowell's husband, Thompson Buchanan, wrote a play titled Star of Bengal, which is set on the ship. The play was produced by Christopher Morley and opened in late September, starring Charles Starrett, Joan Lowell, and William P. Carleton. This "consciously superannuated" melodrama features a love affair between the captain's daughter (Lowell) and a sailor (Starrett) that leads to their elopement. The runaways are caught, and the captain (Carleton) is about to hang the sailor; however, upon learning that his daughter is pregnant, the captain turns magnanimous. The play lasted only until November and was generally regarded as unsuccessful. Its failure was rumored to be a contributing factor in Buchanan's and Lowell's subsequent divorce.

See also 

 Lists of shipwrecks

Notes

References

Literature cited

External links 

 Partial registry of the Star of Bengal's voyages
 The Star of Bengal in the wreck registry

Individual sailing vessels
1874 ships
Tall ships of the United States
Merchant ships of the United Kingdom
Merchant ships of the United States
Barques
Three-masted ships
Ships built in Belfast
Maritime incidents in 1908